Close harmony is an arrangement of the notes of chords within a narrow range.

Close Harmony may also refer to:

 Close Harmony (1929 film), a black and white American comedy-drama musical film
 Close Harmony (1981 film), a 1981 short documentary film
 Close Harmony (album), a 1992 box set of The Louvin Brothers recordings